West Commerce Street Historic District in Aberdeen, Mississippi is a historic district that was listed on the National Register of Historic Places in 1988.

It includes properties with street numbers from 721 to 919 on the odd-numbered side of W. Commerce St., and from 730 to 900 on the even-numbered side.  It is all residential.

It consists of 14 contributing houses, built between 1840 and c. 1938, and one contributing structure (a garage) and their outbuildings, with two non-contributing structures interspersed.  Among these is the Reuben Davis House, which is separately listed on the National Register.

The houses and corresponding structures are:
721 W. Commerce (1840), the Mark Prewett House (Panola), Greek Revival
727 W. Commerce (c. 1935), Charlie Clark House, Georgian Revival, and its contributing two-story Georgian Revival garage (c. 1935)
729 W. Commerce (c. 1915), a -story house with porte cochere, with Colonial Revival influence.
730 W. Commerce (1840), Col. Abner Prewett House (Prewett Place). -story, Greek Revival.
732 W. Commerce (1850) Dr. William Alfred Sykes House (The Magnolias). A two-story, Greek Revival. Pivotal.  Also contributing are its one-story kitchen and its one-story well house, and a non-contributing other outbuilding.
803 W. Commerce (1847/1853) Reuben Davis House (Sunset Hill). This two-story central-hall plan house fronted by a portico with "eight massive fluted Doric columns."  Greek Revival. Pivotal.
807 W. Commerce (c. 1925) Bungalow.
800 W. Commerce (c. 1945) Bungalow influence, non-contributing.
806 W. Commerce (c. 1845) John Goodwin House. One-story, brick Greek Revival.
810 W. Commerce (c. 1900) Free classic Queen Anne.
900 W. Commerce (1905) H. B. Sanders House. A two-story bungalow.
901 W. Commerce (c. 1955) -story, brick ranch style house, non-contributing.
905 W. Commerce (1938) -story, five-bay-wide, brick house.
915 W. Commerce (1887) The Andrew J. Brown House (The Oaks). -story frame house. Free classic Queen Anne. And its (c. 1905) garage, and its (c. 1905) gazebo.
919 W. Commerce (c. 1885/1937) The Castle. -story house with a polygonal tower. Gothic Revival.

References

Greek Revival architecture in Mississippi
Queen Anne architecture in Mississippi
Georgian architecture in Mississippi
Colonial Revival architecture in Mississippi
Bungalow architecture in Mississippi
Historic districts on the National Register of Historic Places in Mississippi
Geography of Monroe County, Mississippi
National Register of Historic Places in Monroe County, Mississippi